JWH may refer to:

 John Wesley Hardin, an American gun-fighter from the 18th century
 John W. Henry, futures trader and owner of the Boston Red Sox
 John Winston Howard, former Prime Minister of Australia
 JWH-133, a medication used to prevent Alzheimer's disease
 John W. Huffman, creator of the JWH cannabinoids
 Jared Waerea Hargreaves- New Zealand rugby league player for the Manly Sea Eagles